Deževa is a village situated in Novi Pazar municipality in Serbia.

This is where the known is accepted famous Deževa Agreement.

References

Populated places in Raška District